Events from the year 1830 in the United States.

Incumbents

Federal Government 
 President: Andrew Jackson (D-Tennessee)
 Vice President: John C. Calhoun (D-South Carolina)
 Chief Justice: John Marshall (Virginia)
 Speaker of the House of Representatives: Andrew Stevenson (D-Virginia)
 Congress: 21st

Events
 January 11 – LaGrange College (now the University of North Alabama) opens, becoming the first publicly chartered college in Alabama.
 January 12–27 – Robert Y. Hayne of South Carolina debates the question of states' rights vs. federal authority with Daniel Webster of Massachusetts in the United States Congress.
 March 12 – Craig vs. Missouri: The United States Supreme Court rules that state loan certificates are unconstitutional.
 March 26 – Joseph Smith's religious text "Book of Mormon" is published in Palmyra, New York.
 May 24 – Sarah Josepha Hale's nursery rhyme "Mary Had a Little Lamb" is published in Boston.
 May 28 – U.S. congress passes the Indian Removal Act.
 September 27 – Treaty of Dancing Rabbit Creek with Choctaw nation. (First removal treaty signed after the Removal Act.)

Births
 January 7 – Emerson Opdycke, businessman and Union Army brigadier general during the American Civil War (died 1884)
 January 8 – Gouverneur K. Warren, civil engineer and Union Army general in the American Civil War (died 1882)
 January 19 – George B. Cosby, Confederate brigadier general during the American Civil War (died 1909)
 January 25 – Thomas W. Palmer, United States Senator from Michigan from 1883 till 1889. (died 1913)
 January 31 – James G. Blaine, United States Senator from Maine from 1876 till 1881 and United States Secretary of State in 1881 and from 1889 till 1892. (died 1893)
 March 1 – Alexander Caldwell United States Senator from Kansas from 1871 till 1873. (died 1917)
 March 12 – William F. Brantley, Confederate general in the American Civil War (died 1870)
 March 20 – Eugene Asa Carr, Union Army general in the American Civil War (died 1910)
 April 26 – Thomas M. Norwood, United States Senator from Georgia from 1871 till 1877. (died 1913)
 May 9 – Harriet Lane, acting First Lady of the United States during James Buchanan's presidency (died 1903)
 May 13 – Zebulon Baird Vance, Confederate military officer in the American Civil War, the 37th and 43rd Governor of North Carolina, U.S. Senator (died 1894)
 May 23 – 
Henry M. Teller, United States Senator from Colorado from 1876 till 1882 and from 1885 till 1909. (died 1914)
 George Lucas Hartsuff, Union Army major general in the American Civil War (died 1874)
 November 26 – Horace Tabor, United States Senator from Colorado in 1883. (died 1899)
 December 8 – William Pitt Kellogg, United States Senator from Louisiana from 1868 till 1872 and from 1877 till 1883. (died 1918)
 December 10 – Emily Dickinson, poet (died 1886)
 December 13 – James D. Walker, United States Senator from Arkansas from 1879 till 1885. (died 1906)

Deaths
 January 17 – Elizabeth Willing Powel, socialite and Patriot (born 1743)
 February 1 – Thomas W. Cobb, U.S. Senator from Georgia from 1824 to 1828 (born 1784)
 June 25 – Ephraim McDowell, physician and pioneer surgeon (born 1771)
 July 2 – Robert H. Adams, U.S. Senator from Mississippi in 1830 (born 1792)
 August 6 – David Walker, African American abolitionist and writer (born 1796)
 August 9 – James Armistead Lafayette, African American slave, Continental Army double agent (born 1748 or 1760)
 September 24 – Elizabeth Monroe, First Lady of the United States (born 1768)
 October 14 – John McLean, U.S. Senator from Illinois from 1824 to 1825 and from 1829 to 1830 (born 1791)

See also
Timeline of United States history (1820–1859)

References

Smith, Joseph, Jr. (1830), The Book of Mormon: An Account Written by the Hand of Mormon, Upon Plates Taken from the Plates of Nephi, Palmyra, New York: E. B. Grandin, OCLC 768123849 . See Book of Mormon.

External links
 

 
1830s in the United States
United States
United States
Years of the 19th century in the United States